Maxime Gonalons (born 10 March 1989) is a French professional footballer who plays as a defensive midfielder for Ligue 1 club Clermont.

Club career

Youth career
Gonalons had been with Olympique Lyonnais since the age of 10 climbing through the club's youth sections after joining the club from local outfit FC Villefranche. For the 2007–08 season, at the age of 18, he was promoted to the club's Championnat de France amateur team appearing in 26 matches scoring two goals. Lyon finished in a respectable 7th in their group, but weren't allowed progression to the playoffs. The next season, he again spent with the CFA squad, however, during the summer leading up to the season, Gonalons picked up a staph infection on his ankle, which was, at one point, deemed career threatening with reportedly future diagnosis of sepsis and amputation. However, over the course of the season, Gonalons gradually got back into playing shape and eventually returned to the team. He made 24 appearances scoring 3 goals, one each against local rivals AS Lyon Duchère and Saint-Étienne, and one against Marignane. Lyon finished first among professional clubs in the group and qualified for the playoffs. Gonalons started both the 4–3 semi-final win on penalties and the 3–0 victory over Sochaux in the final picking up a yellow card.

Lyon
Following the season, on 6 July 2009, Gonalons signed his first professional contract agreeing to a one-year deal with the club. The club does have the option to keep him for the next two seasons over after the one-year deal expires. Gonalons was assigned the number 41 shirt and trained with the senior team during pre-season. He made his professional debut on 25 August 2009 in the second leg of the club's UEFA Champions League play-off round match against Anderlecht appearing as a substitute in the 73rd minute for Jérémy Toulalan.

On 20 October, after coming on as a 42nd-minute substitute for the injured Cris, Gonalons scored his first professional goal against  Liverpool at Anfield, in the 72nd minute, in the UEFA Champions League. The equalizing goal drew the match level at 1–1 and Lyon went on to win the match 2–1 with a goal from César Delgado in injury time. On 16 January 2010, Gonalons scored his first career league goal against Nancy. Ten days later, Gonalons and Lyon agreed to contract extension, which will keep the midfielder at the club until 2014.

Gonalons played a total of 330 games for Lyon and is eighth on the all time appearance list for the club.

Roma
On 3 July 2017, Gonalons signed a four-year contract with Roma.

Sevilla (loan)
On 20 August 2018, Sevilla announced the signing of Gonalons on a season-long loan.

Granada
On 2 September 2019, Gonalons joined Granada CF in the Spanish top tier, on a one-year loan deal. He signed permanently with the club for €4 million.

Clermont
On 1 July 2022, Gonalons returned to France and signed with Clermont for two years with an option to extend.

International career
On 11 November 2011, Gonalons received his first cap for the French senior team in a friendly match against the United States.

Personal life
Gonalons was born in Vénissieux, Metropolis of Lyon. He is the cousin of the footballer Lucas Camelo.

Career statistics

Club

International
Source:

Honours
Lyon
Coupe de France: 2011–12
Trophée des Champions: 2012

References

External links

1989 births
Living people
People from Vénissieux
French footballers
France under-21 international footballers
France international footballers
Association football midfielders
Olympique Lyonnais players
A.S. Roma players
Sevilla FC players
Granada CF footballers
Clermont Foot players
Ligue 1 players
Serie A players
La Liga players
French expatriate footballers
Expatriate footballers in Italy
Expatriate footballers in Spain
French expatriate sportspeople in Italy
French expatriate sportspeople in Spain
Sportspeople from Lyon Metropolis
Footballers from Auvergne-Rhône-Alpes